Terry Allen (8 June 1924 – 8 April 1987) was an English flyweight boxer. During his career, he became British, Commonwealth, European and World flyweight champion.

Family 
Born in Islington, London, Allen's father was a professional boxer. His mother died when he was two, and he was raised by his grandmother. Six of his cousins were also professional boxers.

Amateur career 
He started boxing when he was nine and won a schoolboy championship. During his amateur career, he won 102 out of 107 contests.

Professional career 
Managed by Johnny Sharpe, Allen had his first professional fight in September 1942, at the age of eighteen. He beat Jim Thomas on points over six rounds at Caledonian Road Baths, Islington.

He then proceeded to win his first thirty-two fights. In 1942, during the Second World War, he joined the Royal Navy, and while stationed at Alexandria, Egypt, he fought and won fifteen bouts, between May 1944 and December 1945. By late 1945, he was considered chief flyweight contender by Ring magazine.

His first defeat was in May 1946, against Alex Murphy by a knockout, in the sixth round at Harringay Arena. He suffered a second defeat in March 1947, when he was knocked out in the first round by Rinty Monaghan.

In March 1948, Allen beat Dickie O'Sullivan on a disqualification to take the BBBofC South East Area flyweight title. In his next fight he was beaten on points by Jackie Bryce.

In February he beat Monaghan over 8 rounds, and in June 1949 beat Norman Tennant in an eliminator to get a shot in September at Monaghan's British title, with the European, Empire and world titles also at stake. They fought in Monaghan’s home town of Belfast, and the result after fifteen rounds was a draw.

Shortly after this fight, Monaghan retired, relinquishing his titles, and in April 1950, Allen fought Honore Pratesi of France for the vacant European and World flyweight titles. The fight was held at Harringay Arena and Allen won on points over fifteen rounds to gain both titles.

In August 1950, he defended his World title against Dado Marino of the United States. The fight was held in Honolulu and Marino won a unanimous points decision to take the title.

In October 1950, Allen lost his European title when he defended it in Nottingham against Jan Sneyers of Belgium. Sneyers won on points, but the British crowd thought that Allen had won, and booed the decision.

In June 1951, Allen fought Vic Herman for the British flyweight title vacated by Rinty Monaghan. The fight was in Leicester and Allen won on points.

In November 1951, Allen had a re-match with Dado Marino for the World flyweight title. The fight was in Honolulu, and Marino won again by a unanimous decision.

In March 1952, he fought against Teddy Gardner for the British, Commonwealth and European flyweight titles. The fight was held in Newcastle-upon-Tyne, and Gardner won on points to take all three titles. Shortly afterwards Gardner retired leaving the titles vacant.

In October 1952, Allen fought for the vacant British flyweight title, against Eric Marsden. He won the title when the fight was stopped in the sixth after Marsden collapsed.

In October 1953, he had another shot at a World title when he fought Yoshio Shirai, in Tokyo. Unfortunately for Allen, the Japanese won a unanimous decision.

In February 1954, Allen defended his British title against Eric Marsden, who he had beaten previously. He won again, this time on a disqualification in the fifth round.

Allen was knocked out in the second round by the unbeaten Dai Dower in March, and his last fight was an unsuccessful challenge for the vacant European flyweight title. He fought Nazzareno Giannelli, in Milan, Italy, but the Italian won on points.

He was set to defend his British title against Marsden in November, but on 30 September 1954 announced his retirement from boxing.

Retirement 
Allen had worked as a barrow boy at the beginning of his boxing career, and after retiring, he was able to open his own vegetable business in Islington market.

Professional boxing record

See also 
List of flyweight boxing champions
List of British flyweight boxing champions

References

External links 
 
 Maurice Golesworthy, Encyclopaedia of Boxing (Eighth Edition) (1988), Robert Hale Limited, 
 Terry Allen - CBZ Profile

1924 births
1987 deaths
English male boxers
Flyweight boxers
People from Islington (district)
World boxing champions
Royal Navy personnel of World War II
Boxers from Greater London